The 2009 season was the eighth for the  Team Columbia–High Road Women cycling team, which began as the T-Mobile team in 2003. The main new riders for the team were the European Time Trial Champion Ellen van Dijk and the Canadian national champion Alex Wrubleski. Alexis Rhodes and Madeleine Sandig left the team and Anke Wichmann and Oenone Wood both retired.

Roster

The team was presented together with the males team on 11 January 2009 in Mallorca.

The main new rider for the team was Ellen van Dijk, 21 years old, a time trial specialist and the European Time Trial Champion (under-23). The Canadion Alex Wrubleski, national champion and the winner of the Redlands Bicycle Classic also joined the team.

The contract of Alexis Rhodes ended and she moved to Webcor on the recommendation of Scrymgeour. Madeleine Sandig moved to Equipe Nürnberger Versicherung and Anke Wichmann and Oenone Wood retired.

Ages as of 1 January 2009. 

Source

Riders who joined the team for the 2009 season

Riders who left the team during or after the 2008 season

Season

February 
The season started for the team with the Ladies Tour of Qatar in February. Ellen van Dijk secured the Best Young Rider prize, with consistency after taking the jersey on the first day when she made it into the front group of 21 riders and finished third. The last hour of the last stage was a tense affair for the Dutchwoman, when she was caught on the wrong side of a split. She had to get past seven groups and finally crossed the line in sixth place, in the same time as stage winner, and won the overall Best Young Rider's classification.

Results

Season victories

Results in major races

Women's World Cup 2009

Judith Arndt finished 4th in the individual and the team finished 5th in the teams overall standing.

Grand Tours

UCI World Ranking

The team finished second in the UCI ranking for teams, behind Cervélo TestTeam (women).

References

2009 UCI Women's Teams seasons
2009 in American sports
Velocio–SRAM Pro Cycling